Seasons End is the fifth studio album by British neo-progressive rock band Marillion, released in 1989. The album was the first to feature current lead vocalist Steve Hogarth, following the departure of former vocalist Fish in late 1988. It reached number 7 on the UK Albums Chart.

Overview
Following the departure of Fish, Marillion started to audition singers while writing the new album, and they eventually chose Steve Hogarth. The music for Seasons End was mostly written before Hogarth joined Marillion, and only a couple of songs on it actually have some pieces written by him, these being "Easter" and "The Space". A number of the lyrics were written by John Helmer, who the band had commissioned before Hogarth joined. Helmer would continue to contribute lyrics throughout the 1990s. "The Space" was partly recycled from an unreleased song by Hogarth's old band How We Live titled "Wrapped in the Flag".

The bonus disc of the 1999 re-issue of Clutching at Straws contains a number of nascent versions of songs that would end up on Seasons End with vocals and lyrics by Fish, these demos having been produced during the writing sessions for the ill-fated fifth studio album with Fish. (A number of the lyrical concepts from these demos, such as The Voice in the Crowd, would later resurface on Fish's debut studio album, Vigil in a Wilderness of Mirrors.)

The album was produced jointly by Marillion and Nick Davis (who would go on to work with Genesis and associated acts).

Singles
As with Marillion's previous two studio albums, three singles were released from Seasons End. The first single was "Hooks in You" in August 1989, followed by "The Uninvited Guest" in November and "Easter" in March 1990.

Cover art
Mark Wilkinson, who had designed all previous Marillion covers, had been asked to provide the artwork but declined, as the band wanted to have a landscape painting, which wasn't his style. Wilkinson would continue to collaborate with Fish, designing the album covers for almost all his solo albums. Therefore, the album also marked a turning point in the band's visual style, towards a more "modern", photographic look created by Bill Smith Studio (including Carl Glover, who would continue working with Marillion after leaving the studio). The four square fields dominating the cover symbolise the four classical elements, earth, air, water and fire (clockwise from top left). At the same time, the cover contained some references to the past: It used the band's original logo, which had been replaced with a "modernised" version on the previous album Clutching at Straws and related releases as well as on B'Sides Themselves (although the 1988 live retrospective The Thieving Magpie also used it). The feather in the "desert" square is a reference to the image of the "magpie" found on Misplaced Childhood (1985) and Fugazi, the "sky" square contains a fragment of the "Jester's" dress introduced on Script for a Jester's Tear (1983), the chameleon in the "fire" square appears on Script for a Jester's Tear, Fugazi (1984) and Misplaced Childhood; the painting with the clown's face falling into the water upside-down is taken from the Fugazi cover. Also, the vinyl version returned to the gatefold format that had been abandoned on the previous studio album.

Lyrics
The lyrics on Seasons End, unlike those of the two previous albums, are not tied together by a common storyline. The opener, "The King of Sunset Town", in John Helmer's original version, was about poverty; however, Hogarth modified it under the impression of the brutal oppression of the Tiananmen Square protests of 1989 by the Chinese government; the line "And everyone assembled here / Remembers how it used to be / Before the 27th came" refers to the 27th Army involved in the massacre. "Easter" addresses The Troubles of Northern Ireland (a topic Fish had previously explored in "Forgotten Sons" in 1983); more indirectly, this also goes for "Holloway Girl", which refers to the imprisonment of Judith Ward in Holloway Prison for IRA bombings. "Seasons End" addresses climate change (a topic to which Marillion would return in 1998 and 2007) – the spelling of the title is intentional, referring not to the end of a season (which would be "Season's End"), but the end of all seasons as a result of global warming eliminating winter altogether. "Berlin" describes the situation in the divided city of Berlin, where Marillion had recorded Misplaced Childhood; the Berlin Wall would eventually come down just weeks after the release of Seasons End.

Regarding "The Space", Steve Hogarth has said that "this song kind of started life in Amsterdam. When I was quite young I saw a tram come down the road and someone had parked a car too close to the tram line. It came down the road and it just tore the side off this car because it couldn't do anything else. It made the most fantastic noise as it did so. Fortunately there was nobody in the car and fortunately the trams in Amsterdam are very thick so I'm not sure the driver even noticed it happen. Years later when I was feeling a bit more like a rock star than I did when I saw it happen, I was thinking about my life. It occurred to me that I was a bit like that tram when I probably ripped the side of a few things I hadn't even felt and I hadn't slowed down either and I probably hadn't noticed. So the words to this song came from that realization. It was one of the first songs we put together when we met in January of 1989."

Critical reception
Mick Wall, writing in Kerrang!, stated, "Vocally and lyrically, of course, we find ourselves on new ground. Hogarth's certainly got a voice, smooth as glass and emotive as hell. And, in common with his more famous predecessor, it's a very un-American voice, the vowel sounds are all Queen's English. But there the comparisons end. Steve Hogarth is no Fish clone. He's no Peter Gabriel nor Phil Collins apologist, either. He doesn't need to be. He's got a voice of his own – and when you listen to it on tracks like 'Easter', and 'Seasons End' or 'After Me', you can almost forget the band ever had another singer."

Track listing

Side one

 "The King of Sunset Town"  – 8:04
 "Easter"  – 5:58
 "The Uninvited Guest"  – 3:52
 "Seasons End"  – 8:10

Side two

 "Holloway Girl"  – 4:30
 "Berlin"  – 7:48
 "After Me"  – 3:20
 "Hooks in You"  – 2:57
 "The Space…"  – 6:14

Note: "After Me" is not included on vinyl editions of the album.

Formats and re-issues
The album was originally released on CD, Cassette, vinyl LP and 12" Picture Disc. "After Me", the b-side of "Hooks in You", was included as a bonus track on the original CD and cassette versions.
In 1997, as part of a series of Marillion's first eight studio albums, EMI re-released Seasons End with remastered sound and a second disc containing bonus material. The bonus disc contained the extended 12" version of the album's second single, "The Uninvited Guest", that single's b-side "The Bell in the Sea", the third single "Easter"'s b-side, "The Release", and six demo versions. The remastered edition was later also made available without the bonus disc.

A new 180 gram vinyl pressing was released in February 2012 by EMI. It was identical to the original vinyl release from 1989, so "After Me" was not included.

Personnel
Marillion:
Steve Hogarth: vocals
Steve Rothery: guitars
Mark Kelly: keyboards
Pete Trewavas: bass
Ian Mosley: drums
With:
Phil Todd: saxophone on "Berlin"
Jean-Pierre Rasle: pipes on "Easter"

Charts

Certifications

References

External links
Liner notes for the remaster by some of the band members and associated people (on the marillion.com band page):
Steve Hogarth
Pete Trewavas
Carl Glover

Marillion albums
1989 albums
Albums produced by Nick Davis (record producer)